Parliamentary elections will be held in Poland in late 2023 to elect members of the Sejm and Senate, although they can be held sooner if a snap election is called, which last occurred in 2007. The previous election, in 2019, resulted in the re-election of a majority Law and Justice government, albeit without a majority in the Senate.

Electoral system
The process of election for the Sejm is through party-list proportional representation via the D'hondt method in multi-seat constituencies, with a 5% threshold for single parties and 8% threshold for coalitions (with the requirements waived for national minorities).

The date of the election will be set by the President of Poland (consistent with constitutional requirements, whereby the election may be held 30 days before the fourth anniversary of the beginning the current convocation of Parliament, on a non-working day, including public holidays). Possible dates are 15 October, 22 October, 29 October and 5 November (and - due to public holidays - 1 November and 11 November).

Should the opposition parties win government, they would require a three-fifths majority of MPs to overturn a presidential veto.

Political parties
The table below lists party groups represented in the Sejm as a result of the 2019 election.

Other parties seeking to take part:

Opinion polls

References

Notes 

Poland
Elections in Poland
2023 in Poland
Future elections in Poland